Frances Helm (October 14, 1923 - December 30, 2006) was an American stage, film, and television actress whose performing career spanned nearly fifty years.

Early life
She was born Mary Frances Helm in Panama City, Florida. Her parents were Thomas William Helm II and Grace Spencer. Her father started as a bookkeeper for the railroad industry then became an accountant for the state of Virginia, moving the family to Richmond when Helm was very young. She had one older brother. Helm graduated from J. A. C. Chandler Junior High School in June 1937. She graduated from John Marshall High School in June 1940.

From the age of ten Helm took piano and voice lessons. Later she studied with Mary Barbour Dixon, who would remain her drama teacher and coach all through secondary school and college. Helm attended the Richmond Professional Institute (RPI) from Fall 1940 through Spring 1942, majoring in Speech and Dramatics. Helm was a member of RPI's Theater Associates, which mounted productions at the school using students and the occasional visiting professional actor. Helm and other RPI drama students also did broadcasts of play readings on the school's radio station. While at the school, Helm dropped her first name for stage billing.

During her last term at RPI, her brother returned to Richmond after being wounded at Pearl Harbor. A Radioman 2/C in the USN, Thomas W. Helm had kept firing an antiaircraft gun during the attack despite being severely wounded; the Navy credited him with bringing down a Japanese aircraft. Invalided out of the service in April 1942, he was used for recruiting and bond drives, with his sister accompanying him. She was pictured at Red Cross events and dances with her brother and other servicemen. Frances Helm also joined other volunteer actors to perform a parody of an old-fashioned melodrama, Ten Nights in a Bar-Room, at military bases in Virginia and Maryland.

Early stage career
After graduating from RPI, Helm moved to New York City, where she took additional drama training at Columbia University while modeling in fashion shows for the Powers Agency. She also worked in radio, both as a voice actress and a personality for variety shows. For one radio show called "Blind Date", hosted by Arlene Francis, Helm was matched with a G.I. for an evening at the Stork Club.

During late 1945 Helm signed up for a theatrical trial by fire, a six-month stint with one of the Clare Tree Major Touring Companies. She performed in The Golden Apple by Lady Gregory, a short play based on an Irish fairy story.

Come September 1946 Helm joined a more traditional touring company with a revival of Life with Father. Cast as "Mary Skinner", the primary love interest, Helm had a lot of publicity during the tour of the Eastern United States. The tour traveled by a large private bus with an attached trailer for sets and props, enabling it to play small towns without train service. The tour finished up in Texas during early March 1947.

From April thru May 1947 Helm made an independent color film called The Clam-digger's Daughter, which was never distributed to theaters for exhibition. Helm credited the film, shot on location in Cape Charles, Virginia, with restoring her Southern accent.
 Living up North has made me lose my accent twice. I got it back the first time by moving in with six Mississippi girls who lived in New York, and the second time by  appearing in a "made-in-Virginia" movie.

She performed in summer stock during 1947 at the Green Mountain Playhouse in Middlebury, Vermont. From June 1948 Helm appeared in summer stock on Long Island in Parlor Story, which had a short run on Broadway the year before. She then starred in Years Ago, a much more successful recent Broadway comedy.

Mister Roberts
By August 1948 Helm had joined the national touring company for Mister Roberts, while the original was then in its sixth month on Broadway. Helm was the only female in the large cast, which included her then husband Robert Keith Jr, who was still using his birth name for billing at the time. The play starred Richard Carlson, James Rennie, Murray Hamilton, and Robert Burton, with a young Cliff Robertson. 
After several weeks in Detroit, the play went to Chicago for a two-week run that turned into twelve months.

While playing Chicago, Helm and other cast members of Mister Roberts put on free plays at veteran's homes in the area. The local newspaper printed photos of Helm with different members of the cast nearly every month, emphasizing her as the only woman in the play. At eleven months into the run the Chicago Tribune published a photo of Helm with her husband in their roles as "Lt. Ann Girard" and "Mannion".

From Chicago the touring company for Mister Roberts moved to Pittsburgh's Nixon Theater in September 1949, with John Forsythe taking over the titular role and Jackie Cooper playing "Ensign Pulver". As with critics in Detroit and Chicago, the Pittsburgh reviewer praised Helm for her delivery while noting the brevity of her part. The tour then went to one and two week runs at smaller cities, finally finishing up with a three-month booking in Boston that ended in April 1950. Helm was so reliable in playing every show that the tour finally dispensed with having an understudy for her three minutes on stage.

Early television
Helm's first television appearance was for a program called Hollywood Screen Test during October 1950. She did an episode of Philco Television Playhouse in May 1951 followed by an episode of Kraft Television Theatre in November. All of these programs were originally broadcast live from New York City, though the latter program was apparently recorded by kinescope and re-broadcast to the West Coast the following month.

The following year she guest starred in episodes of Adventures of Ellery Queen and The Web, both thirty minute live broadcasts. The latter was also recorded by kinescope and re-broadcast in March 1952. Her third program in as many months was for Armstrong Circle Theater, another New York live broadcast.  She did another The Web episode in March 1952, her first TV work alongside her then husband.

Her 1952 performing year having been front-loaded with TV work during the first quarter, Helm did four weekly summer stock plays in Bangor, Maine during June, then one more Television Playhouse episode in November.

She had little performing work in 1953: an uncredited bit part in Never Wave at a WAC, followed by a highly praised week playing "Stella Kowalski" in a stage production of A Streetcar Named Desire, another television episode, then four weeks reprising her roles in Detective Story and Mister Roberts.

Valiant Lady
During 1954 Helm toured with Joe E. Brown from July through October in The Show-Off. Discovering in December 1954 that she had been secretly divorced by her husband five months earlier, Helm was forced to take whatever performing work she could find. Since she was still maintaining residency in New York, Helm took on a soap opera role, as "Linda Kendall" in Valiant Lady. This fifteen minute television program was broadcast live daily from CBS studios in Manhattan. Helm played a woman with mental issues, which years later her mother said was the hardest role to watch her daughter perform.

Helm's exact tenure on the show is difficult to verify. Credited with 246 episodes during calendar year 1955, the only reliable reference date is a newspaper photo from July 17, 1955, showing her, Sue Randall, and Flora Campbell wearing shorts in Central Park while being rehearsed by director Herb Kenwith. It was certainly over by early November 1955, when Helm did a series of plays at the Paper Mill Playhouse for producer Frank Carrington and an episode of Robert Montgomery Presents. Whatever the dates were, it was Helm's longest recurring television role, and a measure of her determination to remain on the East Coast so long as it was professionally possible.

Coastal commuter

1956-1958

By 1956 the great majority of television work was in Southern California, and Helm would have to commute between the coasts. She made an episode of Matinee Theater in April 1956 that producer Aubrey Schenck saw; he cast her in the film Revolt at Fort Laramie as a result. After two more episodes of Matinee Theater, she returned to New York to take over Bethel Leslie's role of "Rachel Brown" in the original Broadway production of Inherit the Wind. Helm joined the production in November 1956 and remained with it until its closing in June 1957.

The remainder of 1957 saw her doing two minor plays. Career was already an off-Broadway success when Helm joined it for a week in Philadelphia. One Foot in the Door, with June Havoc and David White, had its premiere with a ten-day tryout in Philadelphia followed by one week in Boston. Critics in both cities panned it.

With the flop of One Foot in the Door, Helm had to return to the West Coast for more television in late spring 1958. She did three episodes of two different series, but returned to New York later that year for two episodes of a new show called New York Confidential. This show was mainly filmed in New York, but one episode Helm did was made in Jacksonville, Florida.

1959-1960

She spent late spring and summer of 1959 in a center staged road company production of Look Homeward, Angel, playing engagements in Miami, Philadelphia, and San Diego. While on the West Coast, she filmed an episode of The Millionaire.

Helm returned to the East Coast for trial runs of The Deadly Game, an adaption of A Dangerous Game, during January 1960. After the short tryouts, the play moved to Broadway but lasted only 39 performances from February thru March 1960. As with Mister Roberts, Helm was the only woman in the cast, and appeared only briefly on stage in the final scene. She took advantage of this situation to see the opening acts of other plays then performing on Broadway, telling a columnist "I'm waiting for the book versions so I can see how these plays end".

1961-1963

For 1961 Helm did episodes of six television shows, five of them on the West Coast and one in New York. Early 1962 saw her do two episodes of Everglades! on location in her native Florida.

She then took the female lead in the West Coast premiere of Critic's Choice, which opened mid-May 1962 in Los Angeles. Meant for a short run, the production was a hit, running so long the original leading man Edward Binns had to be replaced by Ted Knight due to prior performing commitments. As a contrast, a columnist mentioned that while performing the play at nights, Helm went to the Warner Brothers Studio to make an episode of 77 Sunset Strip during the day. During its tenth week the production was converted from front staging to center staging; it closed two weeks later.

Helm also took part in filming The Ugly American in 1962, playing secretary to Marlon Brando's ambassador.

Later that year, Helm temporarily took over the role of "Nancy Pollock" on The Edge of Night when actress Ann Flood took three months maternity leave.

In February 1963 Helm reprised her role in Critic's Choice with Hans Conried for a one-week run in Louisville, Kentucky. A month later she married for the second time.

Later career
After the birth of her daughter in late spring 1964, Helm resumed working in October of that year. She temporarily took on the role of "Susan Dunbar" on The Secret Storm, replacing Mary Foskett, who had moved to the West Coast. The show, like many soaps, was still made in New York City at the time. Judy Lewis took over the character on January 7, 1965.

Helm would let a couple of years go by between performing engagements for the rest of her career. She did two TV episodes in 1967, an odd little set of playlets in 1969, before resuming a fuller schedule in 1972. That year saw her join a touring company for the summer season, playing a small role in Remember Me,  a comedy by Ronald Alexander. She then had a starring role in Welcome Home, playing opposite Pernell Roberts, in an original play by Edmund Hartmann. The production ran three weeks at Chicago's Ivanhoe Theater.

During 1976 Helm did an episode of Kojak then she and Danny Aiello starred in a Broadway flop called Wheelbarrow Closers, which lasted for only 7 previews and 8 performances. She had a smaller role in the original production of Manny in 1979, which lasted for about a month on Broadway. She had better luck with Broadway revivals, albeit in understudy positions, for Morning's at Seven in 1980-81 and You Can't Take It With You in  1983–84.

As her stage career wound down, Helm continued doing screen work, making an episode of an obscure TV series and the film A Little Sex in 1982. She did two more films, a bit part in Shakedown (1988) and larger role in Electric Moon (1992). Her final performing work was for a TV movie, Love and Betrayal: The Mia Farrow Story in 1995.

Personal life

Helm married Robert Alba Keith on January 3, 1948, in Richmond. They were in Mister Roberts for eighteen months, did at least one television episode together, but separated on July 28, 1953. On December 8, 1954, Helm charged Keith with "introducing another woman as his wife", without naming her. Newspapers reported in January 1955 that Keith had already obtained a Mexican divorce six months earlier and remarried to dancer Judy Landon. At a settlement hearing, Helm agreed to accept the divorce and receive $250 monthly alimony from Keith. However, a few weeks later the alimony was set aside on a "quirk" of California law wherein only the party filing for divorce could claim alimony.
 
In April 1963 Helm married Walter C. Wallace, a former assistant Secretary of Labor in the Eisenhower administration. He was the personnel director for a New York paper company. The couple had one child, a daughter Laura Wallace, born in late spring 1964. They remained married until Helm's death in 2006.

According to her obituary in Variety, Helm was a long-time member of The Player's Club and had served on its board of directors.

Stage performances

Filmography

Notes

References

External links
 

1923 births
2006 deaths
20th-century American actresses
Actresses from Florida
American film actresses
American stage actresses
American television actresses